Njimi was the capital of the Kanuri state of Kanem (later Kanem-Bornu), north of Lake Chad, from the 11th through the 14th centuries. Founded by the Sefawa dynasty in the 11th century, the town dominated trans-Saharan trade in ivory and slaves between the central Sahara and Libya. The precise location of Njimi has yet to be determined.

References

Destroyed cities
Kanem Empire
Former populated places in Chad